Two ships were named Empire Orwell.

Ship names